Occasio may refer to:
Latin name for Caerus, personification of opportunity
 A branch design of Washington Mutual